The following is a list of 2016 box office number-one films in China (only Mainland China).

References

See also
List of Chinese films of 2016

China
Box
2016